The 1942 Portuguese presidential election was held on 8 February. Óscar Carmona ran unopposed and was reelected for a third term.

Results

Notes and references

See also
 President of Portugal
 Portugal
 Politics of Portugal

Presidential elections in Portugal
Portugal
President
Portugal